Abraham Løkin (born Abraham Hansen 16 June 1959, Fuglafjørður, Faroe Islands) is a former Faroe Islands Association football player and former manager of Faroese football club ÍF Fuglafjørður. He is the father of Elin Løkin, Bogi Løkin, Karl Løkin and Steffan Løkin.

In November 2003, to celebrate UEFA's jubilee, he was selected by the Faroe Islands Football Association as the country's Golden Player - the greatest player of the last 50 years.

Club career
Løkin is Fuglafjørður's most famous player, serving his local team for many years. He also had spells in Sweden, Denmark and France as well as at Faroe club teams NSÍ Runavík and B68.

He is currently signed as the manager for ÍF Fuglafjørður for the 2009/2010 season, with the possibility for prolonging.

International career
Løkin made his debut in an August 1988 friendly match against Iceland, the country's first FIFA-recognized match. He was a regular for the Faroe Islands in their first competitive years, earning a total of 22 caps (38 including unofficial matches). He played his last international match in September 1994 against Greece.

Personal life
His son, Bogi Løkin, is also a Faroese international footballer and currently plays for ÍF Fuglafjørður along with his younger brother Karl Løkin, a Faroe Islands U21 player.

References

External links
 - Faroe Islands' Golden Player
 - Abraham Løkin's profile on the B68 Toftir website (Faroese)

1959 births
People from Fuglafjørður
Living people
Faroese footballers
Faroe Islands international footballers
UEFA Golden Players
Odense Boldklub players
Boldklubben Frem players
US Boulogne players
NSÍ Runavík players
B68 Toftir players
ÍF Fuglafjørður players
B36 Tórshavn players
Association football midfielders